Labour Statistics Convention, 1985 is  an International Labour Organization Convention.

It was established in 1985, with the preamble stating:

Having decided upon the adoption of certain proposals with regard to the revision of the Convention concerning Statistics of Wages and Hours of Work, 1938 (No. 63), ...

Ratifications 
As of 2023, the convention had been ratified by 51 states.

External links 
Text.
Ratifications.

International Labour Organization conventions
Statistical data agreements
Treaties concluded in 1985
Treaties entered into force in 1988
Treaties of Armenia
Treaties of Australia
Treaties of Austria
Treaties of the Byelorussian Soviet Socialist Republic
Treaties of Benin
Treaties of Bolivia
Treaties of Brazil
Treaties of Canada
Treaties of Colombia
Treaties of Costa Rica
Treaties of Cyprus
Treaties of Czechoslovakia
Treaties of the Czech Republic
Treaties of Denmark
Treaties of El Salvador
Treaties of Finland
Treaties of Germany
Treaties of Greece
Treaties of Guatemala
Treaties of Hungary
Treaties of India
Treaties of Ireland
Treaties of Israel
Treaties of Italy
Treaties of South Korea
Treaties of Kyrgyzstan
Treaties of Latvia
Treaties of Lithuania
Treaties of Mauritius
Treaties of Mexico
Treaties of Moldova
Treaties of the Netherlands
Treaties of New Zealand
Treaties of Norway
Treaties of Panama
Treaties of Poland
Treaties of Portugal
Treaties of the Soviet Union
Treaties of San Marino
Treaties of Slovakia
Treaties of Spain
Treaties of Sri Lanka
Treaties of Eswatini
Treaties of Sweden
Treaties of Switzerland
Treaties of Tajikistan
Treaties of the Ukrainian Soviet Socialist Republic
Treaties of the United Kingdom
Treaties extended to the Isle of Man
Treaties extended to Gibraltar
Treaties of the United States
Treaties extended to Jersey
Treaties extended to Guernsey
Treaties extended to the British Virgin Islands
Treaties extended to Bermuda
Treaties extended to Norfolk Island
1985 in labor relations